Earl Thomas Martineau (August 30, 1896 – January 20, 1966) was an American football player and coach.  He played halfback at the University of Minnesota and was selected as an All-American in 1922 and 1923 and served as the captain of the 1923 Minnesota team.  While at the University of Minnesota, Martineau was a member of Sigma Chi fraternity. After graduating from Minnesota, Martineau became a football coach.  From 1924 to 1928, he was the head football coach at Western Michigan University, then known as Western State Normal School and Western State Teachers College, compiling a record of 26–10–2 in five seasons.  His 1926 team tallied a record of 7–1.  Martineau later served as a backfield coach for Purdue.  In 1932, Martineau began a long association with Fritz Crisler.  He was the backfield coach for Crisler at Princeton University from 1932 to 1937 and an assistant coach under Crisler at the University of Michigan from 1938 to 1945.

Early life and playing career
Martineau attended West High School in Minneapolis, Minnesota, from which he graduated in 1917.  He enlisted with the United States Marine Corps and served overseas from 1917 to 1919. He died of a heart attack in 1966.

Head coaching record

References

External links
 

1896 births
1966 deaths
Minnesota Golden Gophers football players
Michigan Wolverines football coaches
Princeton Tigers football coaches
Purdue Boilermakers football coaches
Western Michigan Broncos football coaches
College men's track and field athletes in the United States
College track and field coaches in the United States
United States Marine Corps personnel of World War I
United States Marines
Sports coaches from Minneapolis
Players of American football from Minneapolis